is a Japanese swimmer who competed in the 2008 Summer Olympics.

References

1985 births
Living people
Japanese male freestyle swimmers
Japanese male butterfly swimmers
Olympic swimmers of Japan
Swimmers at the 2008 Summer Olympics
Asian Games medalists in swimming
Swimmers at the 2010 Asian Games
Universiade medalists in swimming
Asian Games gold medalists for Japan
Asian Games silver medalists for Japan
Medalists at the 2010 Asian Games
Universiade gold medalists for Japan
Medalists at the 2011 Summer Universiade
21st-century Japanese people